Lineodes triangulalis is a moth in the family Crambidae. It was described by Heinrich Benno Möschler in 1890. It is found in Cuba, Puerto Rico, Jamaica, Dominica, the Bahamas, Mexico, Honduras, Guatemala, Colombia, Trinidad and Venezuela. In the United States it has been recorded from Florida and Texas.

The length of the forewings is 7.7-9.7 mm. The wings are dark brown with narrow white medial and antemedial areas.

The larvae have been reared on the leaves of Capsicum frutescens.

References

Moths described in 1890
Spilomelinae